Gonzalo García Zorro ( 1500 – 1566) was a Spanish conquistador who participated in the Spanish conquest of the Muisca people. García Zorro was encomendero (mayor) of Santa Fe de Bogotá for seven terms, and received the encomiendas of Fusagasugá and Fosca.

He married three times, twice with Muisca women, and had one daughter, Francisca, and a son, Diego. García Zorro died of wounds he suffered in a duel with Alonso Venegas. Venegas was the son of fellow conquistador Hernán Venegas Carrillo and the grandson through his mother of Sagipa, the last zipa (leader) of the Muisca, whom García Zorro had helped to kill.

Knowledge of the life of García Zorro comes from the works Elegías de varones ilustres de Indias (1589) and El Carnero (1638), by Juan de Castellanos and Juan Rodríguez Freyle respectively.

Biography 
Gonzalo García Zorro was born around 1500 in Guadalcanal, at the border between Extremadura and Seville. His parents were Teresa González de Sancha and Diego Alonso El Zorro. Gonzalo García Zorro had a brother, Antonio, and a sister.

García Zorro joined the expedition led by Gonzalo Jiménez de Quesada from Santa Marta towards the Muisca Confederation in April 1536 as a cavalry leader. García Zorro was later convicted of crimes against the last zipa, Sagipa.

Gonzalo García Zorro was seven times encomendero of Santa Fe de Bogotá: in 1544 succeeding Juan Ruiz de Orejuela, who succeeded García Zorro again; from 1545 to 1546, succeeding the second term of Juan Ruiz de Orejuela and preceding Juan de Céspedes; in 1548
between the reign of Juan Muñoz de Collantes and the third term by Juan Ruiz de Orejuela; from 1550 to 1551 in between the terms of Juan de Avellaneda; between 1553 and 1554 succeeding Juan de Rivera and preceding Juan Tafur; in 1556 between the terms of Antonio Ruiz and Domingo Lozano; and finally in 1564 succeeding Juan Ruiz de Orejuela again and preceding Andrés de Molina.

Gonzalo García Zorro received the encomiendas of Fusagasugá, and Fosca. The encomienda of Suesca was shared between Gonzalo García Zorro and Juan Tafur.

Gonzalo García Zorro died in 1566 at Santa Fe de Bogotá of wounds he received in a duel with Alonso Venegas. Venagas was the son of Magdalena de Guatavita, daughter of Sagipa, and Hernán Venegas Carrillo.

See also 

 List of conquistadors in Colombia
 Spanish conquest of the Muisca
 Hernán Pérez de Quesada, Hernán Venegas Carrillo
 Gonzalo Jiménez de Quesada

References

Bibliography

Further reading 
 
 
 

Year of birth uncertain
1566 deaths
Duelling fatalities
16th-century Spanish people
16th-century explorers
Spanish conquistadors
Extremaduran conquistadors
People from Seville
Encomenderos
Mayors of Bogotá
History of Colombia
History of the Muisca